Dong River (東江, East River) may refer to:

 Dong River (China) (Dongjiang), a river in China's Guangdong Province
 Dong River (South Korea) (Donggang), a river in South Korea's Gangwon Province

See also 
 East River (disambiguation)
 Đồng Nai river
 Vàm Cỏ Đông River